Landscape with Pollard Willows is an oil painting created in April 1884 by Vincent van Gogh.

See also
 List of works by Vincent van Gogh

References

Further reading
 Faille, Jacob Baart de la (1970) [1928] The Works of Vincent van Gogh. His Paintings and Drawings, Amsterdam: J.M. Meulenhoff, no. 31 .
 Jan Hulsker (1980), The Complete Van Gogh, Oxford: Phaidon, no. 477.

External links

Paintings by Vincent van Gogh
1884 paintings